Becoming is the third studio album by Filipino singer Sarah Geronimo, released on July 20, 2006, under Viva Records. The album is Geronimo's first international release, produced by Christian de Walden and Carlo Nasi. To date, the album has reached Platinum by the Philippine Association of the Record Industry, selling 30,000 units in the Philippines.

Singles 
Becomings carrier single, "I Still Believe in Loving You", was written by Christian de Walden. The album went gold on its first week of release, with sales of 15,000 units. The second single is the powerful ballad "Carry My Love", translated by Lori Barth, an English adaptation of the original Spanish song "Amor Cobarde" by Marta Sanchez and written by Vito Mastrofancesco, Alberto Mastrofancesco and Carlos Toro. The third and final single of the album, "Iingatan Ko (Ang Pag-ibig Mo)", was also an English adaptation of a song originally sung Betzaida. It was originally titled "Aluciname", written by Steve Singer and Claudia Brant and was translated to Tagalog by Jimmy Antiporda.

"Magliliwanag Rin... Muli" was also an adaption from another Marta Sanchez's single called "Lejos de aquella noche". The seventh and fourteenth tracks of the album are the same songs. "Ala-Ala Mo" was written by Dennis Clark and Steve Singer with Cecile Azarcon. While "So Heartbroken" is the English version of "Ala-Ala Mo", translated by Dennis Clark and Steve Singer.

Commercial performance
In the Philippines, Becoming debuted at number eighteen on the Philippine Top Albums chart, The album had sold 15,000 copies on its first week being certified PARI, then on its second week it climbed on the top ten at number four position. On its third week, the album fall to number five position on the chart. The album left the top ten and fall to number fourteen on its seventh week on the chart. The album left the chart at number twenty position, it spent eight weeks on the chart. The album had sold 60,000 copies in the Philippines and certified 4× PARI Platinum.

 Track listing 

 Personnel 
Credits were taken from Allmusic.Production David Bacon - engineer
 Lori Barth - English translations
 Dennis Clark - background vocals
 Walter Clissen - engineer
 Vincent Del Rosario - executive producer
 Christian De Walden - producer, vocal arrangement
 Vanni G. - arranger
 Bambi Jones - background vocals
 Brandy Jones - background vocals
 George Landress - engineer
 Sylvia Macaraeg - background vocals
 Paul Mirkovich - arranger
 Michael Mishaw - background vocals, vocal arrangement
 Carlo Nasi - producer
 Moy Ortiz - background vocals
 Tony Peluso - engineer
 Romer Rosellon - assistant engineer, mixing assistant
 Ronnie Salvacion - photography
 Ralf Stemmann - arranger, programming
 Luca Vittori - engineer, mixingMusicians'
 Alex Alessandroni - synthesizer, keyboards
 Vinnie Colaiuta - drums
 Sarah Geronimo - lead vocals
 James Harrah - guitar
 Randy Kerber - synthesizer, keyboards
 Abraham Laboriel, Sr. - bass
 Rafael Padilla - percussion
 Dean Parks - guitar
 Tim Pierce - guitar
 Ramon Stagnaro - guitar
 Neil Stubenhaus - bass
 Randy Waldman - piano
 Aaron Zigman - synthesizer, keyboards

Certifications

Release history

References 

2006 albums
Sarah Geronimo albums
Viva Records (Philippines) albums